The 1927 Denver Pioneers football team was an American football team that represented the University of Denver as a member of the Rocky Mountain Conference (RMC) during the 1927 college football season. In their third season under head coach Fred Dawson, the Pioneers compiled a 5–2 record (5–1 against conference opponents), finished second in the RMC, and outscored opponents by a total of 120 to 51.

Schedule

References

Denver
Denver Pioneers football seasons
Denver Pioneers football